Lolita Pille (born August 27, 1982) is a French author, best known for her two novels: Paris 75016: Hell's Diary and Bubble Gum.

Bibliography 
 Hell, Grasset, 2002, 
 Bubble Gum, Grasset, 2004, 
 Crépuscule Ville, Grasset, 2008

Movie Adaptations 
 2006 : Hell, directed by Bruno Chiche.

1982 births
Living people
People from Sèvres
21st-century French women writers
French women screenwriters
French screenwriters
21st-century French screenwriters